Pope St. John XXIII National Seminary (formerly Blessed John XXIII National Seminary) is a Roman Catholic seminary in Weston, Massachusetts. It offers a graduate-level program designed for priesthood candidates aged 30 and above, often called "second-career vocations" or "delayed vocations".

Founded by Boston Archbishop Richard Cardinal Cushing in 1964, the seminary was chartered by the Commonwealth of Massachusetts in 1972 and became accredited by the Association of Theological Schools in 1983.   It awards graduates the M. Div. degree.

Gallery

References

External links

Roman Catholic Archdiocese of Boston
Catholic seminaries in the United States
Universities and colleges in Middlesex County, Massachusetts
Educational institutions established in 1964
Weston, Massachusetts
1964 establishments in Massachusetts